The pocket trumpet is a B♭ trumpet that is constructed with the tubing wound into a much smaller coil than a standard trumpet, generally with a smaller diameter bell. It is not a standard instrument in a concert band or orchestra and is generally regarded as a novelty. It has been used by soloists in jazz (Don Cherry played the similar pocket cornet) or other ensembles to add flair and variety.

History 
The concept of reducing the brass instrument size without reducing the resonating tube length can be seen in several 19th century models of cornet. Pocket cornets have been constructed since the 1870s.

Pocket trumpets are sometimes played as auxiliary instruments by soloists in jazz and dixieland bands, as well as for some specific studio recording demands. Don Cherry's work with the Ornette Coleman quartet is probably the best known example of pocket trumpet playing.

Design and properties 
Tonal characteristics and playability vary due to differences in design. There are two basic design approaches to pocket trumpets:

 reduced bell and bore size design
 standard bell and bore size design.

The models with reduced bell and bore size design originate in 19th-century pocket cornet design and regularly suffer from poor intonation and severely hindered dynamic and timbral range. Regular trumpet mutes cannot be used since the pocket trumpet bell is not a standard size. Models with standard bell and bore size design originally appeared in the US in as late as 1968, mostly following the design of trumpet builder Louis Duda (one-piece hand-hammered "5X" bell, cornet-wound lead pipe, straight-back first valve slide with thumb-throw, fold-back third slide), and manufactured by the Benge Trumpet company.

Standard features 

 Bell Diameter: 
 Bore: Medium-Large  or Large 
 Height: 
 Length:

Famous players 
"Dirty" Walter A. Kibby II of the band Fishbone uses a pocket trumpet for all live shows and recordings.

Onetime Elevator/French Toast drummer and former Fugazi roadie Jerry Busher plays a pocket trumpet on The Evens' song, "Competing With The Till", which is on The Evens' The Odds album.

New Orleans artist Shamarr Allen plays a Kanstul pocket trumpet with a raised bell in most performances.

Common manufacturers and models

 TRISTAR TR-05 B♭ (India)
 Cecilio (Mendini) 77-MT B♭ (China)
 CarolBrass CPT-3000-GLS-Bb-L (Taiwan)
 Amati ATR 314I B♭ (Czech Republic)
 Stagg 77-MT B♭ (Flemish manufacture sold to the world)
 Jupiter 416 B♭ (Taiwan)
 Benge Colibri B♭ (United States)
 Kanstul CCT-905 B♭ (United States)
 Weril EP4072 B♭ (Brazil)

References

External links

A virtual museum of vintage pocket cornets and trumpets
Pocket Trompete Bb - Sib WERIL EP4072

B-flat instruments
Trumpets